Patricia Miller Sichero (born 31 January 1972) is a former professional tennis player from Uruguay.

Biography
Miller grew up in the Uruguayan capital, attending the British Schools of Montevideo. 

A left handed player, she was a singles bronze medalist at the 1987 Pan American Games as a 15-year old.

From 1988 to 1991, she featured in the main draw of several WTA Tour events, and in the early 1990s played in 11 Fed Cup ties for Uruguay with a win–loss record of 8–8.

Her sister, Ana Luisa, was the first victim of Uruguayan serial killer Pablo Goncálvez, who suffocated the 26-year old to death in 1992.

ITF finals

Singles (0–1)

Doubles (4–4)

References

External links
 
 
 

1972 births
Living people
Uruguayan female tennis players
Tennis players at the 1987 Pan American Games
Pan American Games medalists in tennis
Pan American Games bronze medalists for Uruguay
Sportspeople from Montevideo
South American Games medalists in tennis
South American Games gold medalists for Uruguay
Competitors at the 1986 South American Games
Tennis players at the 1991 Pan American Games
Medalists at the 1987 Pan American Games
People educated at The British Schools of Montevideo
20th-century Uruguayan women
21st-century Uruguayan women
Uruguayan people of British descent